The South Western Ambulance Service NHS Foundation Trust (SWASFT) is the organisation responsible for providing ambulance services for the National Health Service (NHS) across South West England. It serves the council areas of Bath and North East Somerset, Bournemouth, Christchurch and Poole Council, Bristol, Cornwall, Devon, Dorset, Gloucestershire, North Somerset, Plymouth, Isles of Scilly, Somerset, South Gloucestershire, Swindon, Torbay and Wiltshire. 

On 1 March 2011, SWASFT was the first ambulance service in the country to become a NHS foundation trust.
On 1 February 2013, the former Great Western Ambulance Service merged with the trust.

SWASFT serves a population of more than 5.5million, and its area is estimated to receive an influx of over 17.5 million visitors each year. The operational area is predominantly rural but also has large urban centres including Bristol, Plymouth, Exeter, Truro, Bath, Swindon, Gloucester, Bournemouth and Poole.

The service is headquartered in Exeter, Devon. It has 96 ambulance stations and six charity-operated air ambulance bases within its area. The chief executive is Will Warrender.

The trust's core operations include:
 Emergency ambulance 999 services
 Urgent Care Services (UCS) – GP out-of-hours medical care (Dorset)
 Tiverton Urgent Care Centre.

It is one of the ambulance trusts providing England with emergency medical services, and employs around 4,500 mainly clinical and operational staff (including Paramedics, Emergency Care Practitioners, Advanced Technicians, Emergency Care Assistants, Ambulance Care Assistants and Nurse Practitioners). In addition there are around 3,200 volunteers including community first responders, BASICS doctors, fire service co-responders and patient transport drivers.

Facts and figures
There are 95 ambulance stations, six air ambulance bases delivered by five charities, two control rooms, two Hazardous Area Response Team (HART) bases and one boat across the SWASFT operational area.

In 2017/2018, approximately one in nine 999 calls to SWASFT were treated over the telephone. "Hear and treat", where the patient receives clinical advice over the telephone, accounted for 11.6% of calls. For 35.8% of incidents the patients experienced "see and treat", when the patient receives treatment or advice at the scene of the incident. In a further 5.9% of incidents, the patient was taken to a non-emergency hospital department such as a community hospital or minor injuries unit. The remaining incidents resulted in a patient being taken to a hospital emergency department, thus around half of the incidents (53%) resulted in a patient not being conveyed.

In 2017, SWASFT was the best performing ambulance service in the country for non-conveyance rates. In addition approximately 62% of patients taken to hospital were admitted – this is again the highest (best) performance for an ambulance trust in the country. This means that when SWASFT takes a patient to an emergency department they are likely to be admitted, not simply treated and discharged, confirming that this is the right place for them to receive the care they need.

The number of compliments received by the trust in 2014/2015 increased by 41% to 2,055 while complaints also rose by 20% to 1,268.

The inspection of the trust by the Care Quality Commission in 2016 identified several areas which required improvement.

The trust's income for 2017/18 was £240million. In 2018, the trust said it would need an extra £12M a year to meet the new ambulance performance standards.

CQC performance rating
In its last inspection of the service in June 2018, the Care Quality Commission (CQC) gave the following ratings on a scale of outstanding (the service is performing exceptionally well), good (the service is performing well and meeting our expectations), requires improvement (the service isn't performing as well as it should) and inadequate (the service is performing badly):

Structure 
SWASFT has two emergency control centres which take emergency calls and dispatch resources: one within the Exeter headquarters and the other at Filton, north of Bristol. , the centres had a combined staff of around 450.

After a reorganisation in 2018, the trust's operations and ambulance stations are divided into eight areas.

Air ambulances
From its control centre, SWASFT is able to deploy a number of charity-funded air ambulance services that operate within its area:

Vehicle fleet

The SWASFT vehicle fleet includes

Tiverton Urgent Care Centre 
In May 2014, the trust won a contract to run a doctor-led minor injuries unit at Tiverton and District Hospital, Devon. Patients do not need an appointment to visit the centre, which is open seven days a week and provides treatment for minor injuries and ailments.

Former services 
SWASFT ran the NHS 111 non-emergency phone service for Dorset, from a call centre at St Leonards. In 2016, the Care Quality Commission told SWASFT to make significant improvements in the service. In July 2019, the trust announced that it was handing back the contract for the service, owing to staff shortages, and on 1 May 2020, the 111 service transferred to Dorset HealthCare.

See also
 Emergency medical services in the United Kingdom
 List of NHS trusts

References

External links 

 
 Inspection reports from the Care Quality Commission

NHS ambulance services trusts
NHS foundation trusts
Health in Bristol
Health in Cornwall
Health in Devon
Health in Dorset
Health in Gloucestershire
Health in Somerset
Health in Wiltshire
Ambulance services in England